Crag is a dice game similar to Yacht and Yahtzee. It is played with three dice. The game is quicker to play than Yahtzee, and in Clement Wood and Gloria Goddard's 1940 Complete Book of Games, it is described as a game that "shares with Yacht the supremacy among sequence dice-casting games".

Gameplay 
Over 13 rounds, players take turns to roll three dice and assign them to certain combinations in a table. After throwing the dice, a player may choose to reroll any number of those dice. This second roll is final, at which point the player chooses which scoring category is to be used for that round. Once a player has used a category, they cannot use it again.

The scoring categories have varying point values, some of which are fixed values and others where the score depends on the value of the dice. The winner is the player who scores most points.

Scoring 
The following are the 13 categories and the points scored in those categories:

If a category is chosen but the dice do not match the requirements of the category the player scores 0 in that category.

The maximum possible score is 244.

References 

Sequence dice games